Drezewo may refer to the following places in Poland:
Dreżewo, West Pomeranian Voivodeship
Drężewo, Masovian Voivodeship